CJK Compatibility is a Unicode block containing square symbols (both CJK and Latin alphanumeric) encoded for compatibility with East Asian character sets. In Unicode 1.0, it was divided into two blocks, named CJK Squared Words (U+3300–U+337F) and CJK Squared Abbreviations (U+3380–U+33FF).

Characters U+337B through U+337E are the Japanese era symbols Heisei (㍻), Shōwa (㍼), Taishō (㍽) and Meiji (㍾) (also available in certain legacy sets, such as the "NEC special characters" extension for JIS X 0208, as included in Microsoft's version and later JIS X 0213). The Reiwa era symbol (㋿) is in Enclosed CJK Letters and Months (the CJK Compatibility block having been fully allocated by the time of its commencement).

Block

History
The following Unicode-related documents record the purpose and process of defining specific characters in the CJK Compatibility block:

See also 
CJK Unified Ideographs
Katakana (Unicode block)
Letterlike Symbols

References 

Unicode blocks